was a Japanese photographer. He was born in Kumano, in the Mie Prefecture of Honshu. When he was twenty-three, he moved to Nagasaki to study western culture. In 1859, he relocated to Hakodate, where he lost a foot due to frostbite. The surgeon who amputated his foot had an interest in photography, specifically ambrotypes, and Tamoto became his apprentice. It was not until 1866 that he began working as a photographer. In 1867, he photographed the construction of the last castle to be built in Japan, Fukuyama Castle. Tamoto took photographs of military leaders Enomoto Takeaki and Hijikata Toshizō during the Battle of Hakodate between 1868-1869. Tamoto opened his own portrait studio in Hakodate in 1869. Starting in 1871, he documented the improvements to infrastructure in the Hokkaido region, eventually presenting 158 photographs of the process to the Settlement Office.

References

Japanese photographers
1832 births
1912 deaths